Ahmed Hussein al-Shar’a, known by the nom de guerre Abu Mohammad al-Julani, is the commander-in-chief of the Syrian militant group Tahrir al-Sham. He was also the emir of one of its predecessor organizations al-Nusra Front, the Syrian branch of al-Qaeda. The US State Department listed Al-Julani as a "Specially Designated Global Terrorist" in May 2013, and four years later announced a $10 million reward for information leading to his capture. As of February 2021, the bounty remains in force.

The nisba "Al-Julani" in his nom de guerre is a reference to Syria's Golan Heights, partially occupied and annexed by Israel during the war in 1967. Al-Julani released an audio statement on 28 September 2014, in which he stated he would fight the "United States and its allies" and urged his fighters not to accept help from the West in their battle against ISIL.

Biography

Early life and Iraq War
al-Julani was born in Riyadh, Saudi Arabia in 1982, where his father worked as an oil engineer until 1989. In that year the al-Julani family returned to Syria, and he grew up and lived in the eastern villas area in the Mezzeh neighborhood of Damascus, until moving to Iraq in 2003. Once al-Julani moved to Iraq to fight American troops after the 2003 invasion of Iraq, he quickly rose through the ranks of Al-Qaeda in Iraq, and reportedly was a close associate of its leader, Abu Musab al-Zarqawi (al-Julani claimed that he had no close relationship with al-Zarqawi in an interview with Frontline).

After his release from Camp Bucca prison in 2008, al-Julani joined with Abu Bakr al-Baghdadi, the head of the then Islamic State of Iraq (ISI). He was soon appointed head of ISI operations in Nineveh Governorate.

Syrian Civil War

Syrian uprising and foundation of al-Nusra
Shortly after the uprising against the government of Syrian president Bashar al-Assad began in 2011, al-Julani played a lead role in planning and enacting a mission, as part of Islamic State of Iraq, to move into Syria and form a sub-branch of the organisation called Jabhat al-Nusra. This group was to act as a front for the Islamic State of Iraq, led by Abu Bakr al-Baghdadi, to whom he had his allegiance and whose command he was under. Al-Julani's formation of Jabhat al-Nusra was facilitated by men, arms and money given to him by the ISI under the orders of Abu Bakr al-Baghdadi. It is disputed whether al-Julani originally formulated the plan or if it came from another leader in Islamic State of Iraq. Julani was declared the "general emir" of al-Nusra, which was first announced in January 2012. By December 2012, the US Department of State declared Jabhat al-Nusra to be an officially designated terrorist organisation, noting that it was simply a new alias for Al-Qaeda In Iraq (aka Islamic State of Iraq). Under al-Julani's leadership, Nusra grew into one of the most powerful groups in Syria.

Rise of ISIL
Al-Julani gained prominence in April 2013, when he refused al-Baghdadi's attempt to dissolve Al-Nusra as a sub-group and incorporate it directly into ISI, under the name of Islamic State of Iraq and the Levant (ISIL). This move would have removed all local autonomy of Jabhat al-Nusra and placed all leaders, decisions, and actions directly under the control of Abu Bakr al-Baghdadi. In order to avoid losing autonomy and the individual identity of Jabhat al-Nusra, Al-Julani directly pledged allegiance to al-Qaeda's leader Ayman al-Zawahiri, who supported al-Julani's request to break away his group as an independent entity. Although, prior to this point, al-Nusra already had sworn allegiance to al-Qaeda through Islamic State of Iraq, now it bypassed the latter and became a direct subsidiary of the former. This change in the chain of allegiance made al-Nusra directly Al-Qaeda's official Syrian branch. Despite his own oath of allegiance to Ayman al-Zawahiri, Abu Bakr al-Baghdadi rejected his ruling and declared that the consolidation of the two organizations was going ahead. Clashes ensued between al-Nusra Front and ISIL for control of Syrian territory.

Resurgence of al-Nusra
In late May 2015, during the Syrian civil war, al-Julani was interviewed by Ahmed Mansour on Qatari news broadcaster Al Jazeera, hiding his face. He described the Geneva peace conference as a farce and claimed that the Western-backed Syrian National Coalition did not represent the Syrian people and had no ground presence in Syria. Al-Julani mentioned that al-Nusra have no plans for attacking Western targets, and that their priority is focused on fighting the Syrian regime, Hezbollah, and the Islamic State of Iraq and the Levant. Al-Julani is credited with saying that the "Nusra Front doesn’t have any plans or directives to target the West. We received clear orders from Ayman al-Zawahiri not to use Syria as a launching pad to attack the U.S. or Europe in order to not sabotage the true mission against the regime. Maybe Al-Qaeda does that but not here in Syria. Assad forces are fighting us on one end, Hezbollah on another and ISIL on a third front. It is all about their mutual interests".

When asked about al-Nusra's plans for a post-war Syria, al-Julani stated that after the war ended, all factions in the country would be consulted before anyone considered "establishing an Islamic state". He also mentioned that al-Nusra would not target the country's Alawite Muslim minority, despite their support for the Assad regime. "Our war is not a matter of revenge against the Alawites despite the fact that in Islam, they are considered to be heretics". A commentary on this interview however states that al-Julani also added that Alawites would be left alone as long as they abandon elements of their faith which contradict Islam.

On August 18, he received the support of Hamza bin Laden, son of Osama bin Laden in a video message produced by the Al-Qaeda's network "Al-Sahab media".

In October 2015, al-Julani called for indiscriminate attacks on Alawite villages in Syria. He said, "There is no choice but to escalate the battle and to target Alawite towns and villages in Latakia". al-Julani also called for Russian civilians to be attacked by former Soviet Muslims.

On 28 July 2016, al-Julani announced in a recorded message that Jabhat al-Nusra would henceforth go under the new name of Jabhat Fateh al-Sham [Front for the Conquest of Syria]. As part of the announcement al-Julani stated that the rebranded group has "no affiliation to any external entity". While some analysts have interpreted this to mean breaking away from Al-Qaeda, the group was not specifically mentioned in the announcement, and al-Julani at that time had not explicitly renounced his oath of allegiance to Ayman al-Zawahiri.

Formation of Tahrir al-Sham
On January 28 2017, Julani announced that Jabhat al-Fath al-Sham would dissolve and be subsumed into a new, larger Syrian Islamist group called Hayat Tahrir Al Sham  ("Assembly for the Liberation of the Levant"). Under Hayat Tahrir Al Sham (called HTS for short), the group focused on fighting Al Qaeda and ISIS to get rid of hostile perceptions from West. With HTS, he crushed ISIS, Al-Qaeda, and the majority of opposing forces in the vicinity of HTS and now controls nearly all of the Idlib Governorate, under the governance of the HTS-aligned Syrian Salvation Government.

In the summer of 2020, al-Julani made frequent public appearances around Idlib in an attempt to gain support from the population. Video output by HTS-affiliated media increased significantly throughout mid-2020, multiple videos being published daily, showing governance videos, distribution of taxations in rural villages, frontline videos, and al-Julani meeting with local militia groups.

Human rights violations and suppression of the press
Julani and his group, HTS, has been accused of violating human rights with the widespread torture in his prisons, the lack of a judiciary system, and cracking down on journalists and news organizations. For example, Bilal Abdul Kareem was imprisoned for six months on no charges, was placed in solitary confinement, and had no access to a lawyer or attorney of any sort.

Documentary 
On June 1, 2021 PBS Frontline released a documentary The Jihadist in which al-Julani's past is investigated in a context of the ongoing Syrian civil war.

Reflecting on his past affiliation with Al-Qaeda, Joulani commented in the interview:"The history of the region and what it went through over the past 20 or 30 years needs to be taken into consideration... We are talking about a region ruled by tyrants, by people who rule with iron fists and their security apparatuses. At the same time, this region is surrounded by numerous conflicts and wars... We can’t take a segment of this history and say so-and-so joined Al Qaeda. There are thousands of people who joined Al Qaeda, but let us ask what was the reason behind these people joining Al Qaeda? That’s the question. Are the U.S. policies after World War II toward the region partially responsibility for driving people towards Al Qaeda organization? And are the European policies in the region responsible for the reactions of people who sympathize with the Palestinian cause or with the way the Zionist regime deals with the Palestinians?.. are the broken and oppressed peoples who had to endure what happened in Iraq, for example, or in Afghanistan, are they responsible..?.. our involvement with Al Qaeda in the past was an era, and it ended, and even at that time when we were with Al Qaeda, we were against external attacks, and it’s completely against our policies to carry out external operations from Syria to target European or American people. This was not part of our calculations at all, and we did not do it at all."

See also
List of fugitives from justice who disappeared

References

External links
Abu Muhammad al-Golani Counter Extremism Project profile

1982 births
Al-Nusra Front members
Al-Qaeda leaders
Critics of Shia Islam
Fugitives wanted by the United States
Fugitives wanted on terrorism charges
Individuals designated as terrorists by the United States government
Leaders of Islamic terror groups
Living people
Members of al-Qaeda in Iraq
People from Riyadh
Prisoners and detainees of Syria
Prisoners and detainees of the United States military
Salafi jihadists
Syrian al-Qaeda members
Syrian people imprisoned abroad